Lansdowne is a former provincial electoral division in Manitoba, Canada.  It was created for the 1888 provincial election, and eliminated with the 1958 election.

Lansdowne was a rural constituency in the province's southwestern corner.  For almost its entire history, it was considered safe for the Liberal Party and its successor, the Liberal-Progressive Party.  Only two non-Liberals were ever elected for the division, and both were defeated after a single term.  Tobias Norris, who served as Premier of Manitoba from 1915 to 1922, represented Lansdowne in the provincial legislature for twenty-one years.

After its elimination, parts of Lansdowne were included in the new constituency of Souris-Lansdowne.

Provincial representatives

References

Former provincial electoral districts of Manitoba